University of Oklahoma Westheimer Airport  (Max Westheimer Airport) is a public use airport in Norman, in Cleveland County, Oklahoma. It is owned by the University of Oklahoma. The National Plan of Integrated Airport Systems for 2021–2025 categorized it as a reliever airport.

The Cleveland County Composite Squadron of Civil Air Patrol meets on Tuesday evenings in a hangar provided by the City of Norman, east of the terminal.

University of Oklahoma Westheimer Airport is important to the local economy as the aerospace and aviation industries are significant sectors to Oklahoma's economy. The $43.7 billion in yearly aviation and aerospace spending benefits the Oklahoma economy.

History 
The airport was built as a civil airport on land donated by the Neustadt family in the name of World War I pilot Max Westheimer to the University of Oklahoma and land from the city of Norman, Oklahoma. It was taken over by the U.S. Navy in 1941 and expanded as a training field; it was then called the Naval Air Station Norman. It was transferred back to the University after the war.

Facilities
The airport covers 727 acres (294 ha) at an elevation of 1,182 feet (360 m) above sea level. It has two asphalt runways: 18/36 is 5,199 by 100 feet (1,585 x 30 m) and 3/21 is 4,748 by 100 feet (1,447 x 30 m).

In the year ending January 1, 2018, the airport had 48,733 aircraft operations, an average of 134 per day: 97% general aviation, 2% military and 1% air taxi. In May 2022, there were 107 aircraft based at this airport: 80 single-engine, 16 multi-engine, 5 jet and 6 helicopter.

References

External links 
 University of Oklahoma - Max Westheimer Airport
 University of Oklahoma Westheimer Airport (OUN) at Oklahoma Aeronautics Commission
 Cleveland County Composite Squadron - Civil Air Patrol
 University of Oklahoma LAAS & WAAS Testing
 Aerial image as of February 1995 from USGS The National Map
 
 

Airports in Oklahoma
Norman, Oklahoma
University of Oklahoma
Buildings and structures in Cleveland County, Oklahoma
University and college airports